Daniel M. Cohen is an American writer, producer, and director. He is the author of the biography Single Handed, about Medal of Honor recipient Tibor Rubin. Cohen wrote, produced and directed the film Diamond Men, starring Robert Forster, Donnie Wahlberg, and Bess Armstrong.

Selected bibliography 

 “Single Handed | The Inspiring True Story of Tibor “Teddy Rubin-Holocaust Survivor, Korean War Hero, and Medal of Honor Recipient” (2015)

References 

21st-century American non-fiction writers
American male writers
Living people
Year of birth missing (living people)
21st-century American male writers